Francesc Torres Torres, also known as Xicu Torres, (born 1962, in Sant Joan de Labritja, Ibiza (Spain)) is a telecommunications engineer. He was elected rector of the Universitat Politècnica de Catalunya (UPC) in December 2017.

Biography 
Francesc Torres graduated in 1988 with a degree in Telecommunications Engineering from the Barcelona School of Telecommunications Engineering. He joined the European Space Agency (ESA) in the same year. A year later, he returned to the UPC, where he began to teach and carry out research, earning a doctoral degree in 1992. He is a specialist in radiocommunications, high frequency circuits and Earth observation. Within the UPC, he has held several positions of responsibility. From 2005 to 2006, he worked at NASA while on sabbatical leave, as an advisor for the GeoSTAR project. He later worked as a scientific advisor in the remote sensing group RSLab, where he specialised in the development and subsequent monitoring of the ESA's SMOS sensor, launched in 2009, on the subject of which he has published more than 200 scientific publications. In 2010, he was appointed full professor at the UPC. He is currently a member of the UPC's CommSensLab, a 2017-2020 María de Maeztu Unit of Excellence. 

In 2017, he was appointed rector of the UPC, having won 50.23% (1,854) of the weighted votes in the elections held in November of that year.

Awards and distinctions 
 1997 - Teaching Improvement Award from the UPC's Board of Trustees for the Radiation and Guided Waves Laboratory (ETSETB)[1]
 As a member of the UPC's remote sensing research team RSLab:
 2000 - Duran Farell Award from the UPC’s Board of Trustees 
 2001 - Ciutat de Barcelona Award from the Barcelona City Council
 2004 - Salva i Campillo Award from the Association of Telecommunications Engineers
 2011 - Cristòfol Juandó Award in Aeronautics from the Barcelona City Council

References 

1962 births
Living people
Rectors of universities in Spain
People from Ibiza
Polytechnic University of Catalonia alumni
Academic staff of the Polytechnic University of Catalonia